By Any Means is the eleventh commercial mixtape by American rapper Kevin Gates. It was released on March 17, 2014, by his Breadwinners Association label, distributed by Atlantic Records. The mixtape debuted at number 17 on the Billboard 200, selling 17,000 copies in the United States. On DatPiff, this mixtape has been downloaded over 1,038,543 times, as of January 22, 2019.

Critical reception

By Any Means received positive reviews from music critics. AllMusic's David Jeffries praised Gates for making tweaks to the above-average mixtape, singling out "Movies" and "Posed to Be in Love" as "unexpected excellence buried on a stopgap release, all of them making this mixtape quite necessary for fans of Gates' albums." Christina Lee of HipHopDX praised Gates' storytelling lyricism and beat choices for remaining consistent in finding the middle-ground between underground and mainstream, calling the mixtape "a smart display of his skills that aims for Rap radio airplay but doesn’t sacrifice too much personality, and a reliable stopgap between now and what’s ahead." Renato Pagnani of Pitchfork praised Gates for mixing the different styles from his previous mixtapes to deliver a strong precursor to his full-length debut, concluding that "With By All Means he completes a three-release run that's as solid as any in recent memory, even if the answer to the question of whether he has another gear in him remains unanswered for the time being."

Commercial performance
By Any Means debuted at number 17 on the US Billboard 200, selling 17,000 copies in its first week of release. On September 7, 2018, the mixtape was certified gold by the Recording Industry Association of America (RIAA) for combined sales and album-equivalent units of over 500,000 units in the United States.

Track listing

Charts

Weekly charts

Year-end charts

Certifications

References

2014 mixtape albums
Albums produced by Honorable C.N.O.T.E.
Kevin Gates albums